The Military ranks of Turkmenistan are the military insignia used by the Armed Forces of Turkmenistan. Being a former Soviet state, Turkmenistan shares a rank structure similar to that of Russia.

Commissioned officer ranks
The rank insignia of commissioned officers.

Other ranks
The rank insignia of non-commissioned officers and enlisted personnel.

References

External links
 

Turkmenistan
Military of Turkmenistan